Oripavine is an opioid and the major metabolite of thebaine. It is the parent compound from which a series of semi-synthetic opioids are derived, which includes the compounds etorphine and buprenorphine. Although its analgesic potency is comparable to morphine, it is not used clinically due to its severe toxicity and low therapeutic index.  Due to its use in manufacture of strong opioids, oripavine is a controlled substance in some jurisdictions.

Pharmacological properties 
Oripavine possesses an analgesic potency comparable to morphine; however, it is not clinically useful due to severe toxicity and low therapeutic index. In both mice and rats, toxic doses caused tonic-clonic seizures followed by death, similar to thebaine. Oripavine has a potential for dependence which is significantly greater than that of thebaine but slightly less than that of morphine.

Bridged derivatives 
Of much greater relevance are the properties of the orvinols, a large family of semi-synthetic oripavine derivatives classically synthesized by the Diels-Alder reaction of thebaine with an appropriate dienophile followed by 3-O-demethylation to the corresponding bridged oripavine. These compounds were developed by the group led by K. W. Bentley in the 1960s, and these Bentley compounds represent the first series of "super-potent" μ-opioid agonists, with some compounds in the series being over 10,000 times the potency of morphine as an analgesic. The simple bridged oripavine parent compound 6,14-endoethenotetrahydrooripavine is already 40 times the potency of morphine, but adding a branched tertiary alcohol substituent on the C7 position results in a wide range of highly potent compounds.

Other notable derivatives then result from further modification of this template, with saturation of the 7,8-double bond of etorphine resulting in the even more potent dihydroetorphine (up to 12,000× potency of morphine) and acetylation of the 3-hydroxy group of etorphine resulting in acetorphine (8700× morphine)—although while the isopentyl homologue of etorphine is nearly three times more potent, its 7,8-dihydro and 3-acetyl derivatives are less potent than the corresponding derivatives of etorphine at 11,000 and 1300 times morphine, respectively. Replacing the N-methyl group with cyclopropylmethyl results in opioid antagonists such as diprenorphine (M5050, which is used as an antidote to reverse the effects of etorphine, M99), and partial agonists such as buprenorphine, which is widely used in the treatment of opioid addiction.

Legal status 
Due to the relative ease of synthetic modification of oripavine to produce other narcotics (by either direct or indirect routes via thebaine), the World Health Organization's Expert Committee on Drug Dependence recommended in 2003 that oripavine be controlled under Schedule I of the 1961 Single Convention on Narcotic Drugs. On March 14, 2007, the United Nations Commission on Narcotic Drugs formally decided to accept these recommendations, and placed oripavine in the Schedule I.

Until recently, oripavine was a Schedule II drug in the United States by default as a thebaine derivative, although it was not explicitly listed. However, as a member state under the 1961 Single Convention on Narcotic Drugs, the US was obliged to specifically control the substance under the Controlled Substances Act following its international control by the UN Commission on Narcotic Drugs. On September 24, 2007, the Drug Enforcement Administration formally added oripavine to Schedule II.

Biosynthesis
This molecule is biosynthetically related to the morphinane derivatives metabolism, where thebaine and morphine are implicated.

References 

4,5-Epoxymorphinans
Glycine receptor antagonists
Opiates
Oripavines
Phenol ethers
Poisons